The Multinational Monitor was a bimonthly magazine founded by Ralph Nader in 1980. It was published by Essential Information. The magazine was formerly published on a monthly basis. Although its primary focus was on analysis of corporations, it also published articles on labor issues and occupational safety and health, the environment, globalization, privatization, the global economy, and developing nations.

The headquarters of the magazine was in Washington DC. It was a non-profit and advertising-free publication.

The last issue (according to the magazine's web-site) had a coverdate of May/June 2009; this magazine may now be permanently defunct, though the web-site still contains a very thorough archive of past issues.

Recurring features

10 Worst Corporations
Since 1992 Multinational Monitor published an annual index recapping the activities and policies of ten corporations who demonstrated particularly egregious behavior.

Lawrence Summers Memorial Award
Each issue declared the bimonthly recipient of the Lawrence Summers Memorial Award, an award given in satirical honor of Lawrence Summers, the Secretary of the Treasury under Bill Clinton and later President of Harvard University, given to companies that "take extraordinary leaps to justify unethical practices." The award referred to the infamous Summers memo written by Summers' aide Lant Pritchett in 1991, when Summers was the World Bank's Chief Economist. The memo advocated transferring toxic waste and pollution from developed countries to least developed countries. (Summers later stated the memo was meant to be satire.)

See also
Corporate crime
Criticisms of corporations
List of corporate scandals
Multinational corporation

References

External links
Official website

Advertising-free magazines
Bimonthly magazines published in the United States
Business magazines published in the United States
Monthly magazines published in the United States
Defunct political magazines published in the United States
Defunct magazines published in the United States
Magazines established in 1980
Magazines disestablished in 2009
Magazines published in Washington, D.C.
Modern liberal magazines published in the United States